Events in the year 1763 in Norway.

Incumbents
Monarch: Frederick V

Events
Bergenhus amt was divided in two, creating the following amt – Nordre Bergenhus amt and Søndre Bergenhus amt.

Arts and literature
25 May – The first newspaper in Norway ("Norske Intelligenz-Seddeler") published its first issue.

Births
24 January – Peder von Cappelen, merchant and politician (d. 1837).

Full date unknown
Johan Andreas Altenburg, merchant and shipowner (died 1824)
Jens Esmark, mountain climber and professor of mineralogy (died 1839)
Diderik Hegermann, politician and Minister (died 1835)

Deaths
18 May - Anders Daae, priest and landowner (born 1680)

See also

References